The Solar Energy Industries Association (SEIA), established in 1974, is the national non-profit trade association of the solar-energy industry in the United States. In 2019, the group reported at least 1,000 member companies.

SEIA is a 501(c)6 non-profit trade association. The association supports the extension of a 30 percent federal solar investment tax credit for eight years.

With the recent high flux of green jobs in the solar industry, SEIA maintains a resource for those looking for solar jobs. The Harvard Business Review claims that the solar industry could absorb all of the jobs lost to the coal industry as it shutters. By 2016, according to the U.S. Department of Energy, the solar industry employed more workers in the energy generation industry than all fossil fuels (oil, coal, and natural gas) combined.

An independent but strategically aligned organization, The Solar Foundation, is a 501(c)3 non-profit organization which develops education & outreach programs to promote the further development of solar energy in the U.S.

Current Board of Directors

Executive committee 
 SEIA Board Chair – Nat Kreamer, Spruce
 SEIA Board Vice Chair – Tom Starrs, SunPower Corporation
 Treasurer – Laura Stern, Nautilus Solar
 Secretary – Michael Maulick, SunLink Corporation
 President – Abigail Ross Hopper, SEIA
 Elected Committeemen
 Tony Clifford, Standard Solar
 Craig Cornelius, NRG Energy
 Ryan Creamer, sPower
 Steve Trenholm, E.ON North America
 Federal Policy Committee Chair – Scott Hennessey, SolarCity
 State Policy Committee Chair – Thomas Plagemann, Vivant Solar

Division Chairs 
 Distributed Generation – Tony Clifford, Standard Solar
 Solar Heating and Cooling – Ed Murray, Aztec Solar
 Solar Services and Consumers – Laura Stern, Nautilus Solar Energy
 Utility-Scale Solar Power – Fred Morse, Morse Associates

Board At-Large 
 Craig Cornelius, NRG Energy
 Ryan Creamer, sPower
 Jeff Dorety, Trina Solar
 Scott Hennessey, SolarCity
 Anne Hoskins, Sunrun, Inc.
 Martin Hermann, 8minutenergy Renewables
 George Hershman, Swinerton Renewable Energy
 Stephen Jones, Blattner Energy
 Nat Kreamer, Spruce
 Daniel Laure, Total New Energies USA
 Michael Maulick, SunLink Corporation
 Matthew McGovern, Cypress Creek Renewables
 Ryan Pfaff, EDF Renewable Energy
 Thomas Plagemann, Vivint Solar
 Dan Shugar, NEXTracker
 Tom Starrs, SunPower Corporation
 Jeremy Susac, SunStreet Energy Group
 Steve Trenholm, E.ON North America
 Darren Van't Hof, US Bancorp
 Kathleen Weiss, First Solar, Inc.
 Jim Yowan, Mortenson Construction
 Scott Zajac, Rockwood Group
 David Zwillinger, D. E. Shaw

Board Elected 
 Mike Hall, Borrego Solar
 Yuri Horwitz, Sol Systems
 Jeff Wolfe, EnergySage
 Andrew Savage, Savage Solar, LLC
 Laura Stern, Nautilus Solar Energy

Honorary Members 
 Arno Harris – Chairman Emeritus
 Steve Hogan

State SEIA Affiliate Representative 
 Gil Hough (TenneSEIA) board member, and PJ Wilson (SESA-Puerto Rico) alternate

Official State Affiliates 
 Arizona Solar Energy Industries Association (AriSEIA)
 Mid Atlantic Solar Energy Industries Association (MSEIA)
 California Solar Energy Industries Association (CALSIEA)
 Missouri Solar Energy Industries Association (MOSEIA)
 Florida Solar Energy Industries Association (FlaSEIA)
 Colorado Solar Energy Industries Association (COSEIA)
 New York Solar Energy Industries Association (NYSEIA)
 Oregon Solar Energy Industries Association (OSEIA)
 Georgia Solar Energy Industries Association (GeorgiaSEIA)
 Tennessee Solar Energy Industries Association (TenneSEIA)
 Gulf States Renewable Energy Industries Association (GSREIA)
 Texas Renewable Energy Industries Association (TREIA)
 Hawaii Solar Energy Association (HSEA)
 Wisconsin Solar Energy Industries Association (WiSEIA)
 MDV-SEIA
 Solar and Energy Storage Association of Puerto Rico (SESA-PR)

See also
Solar Power International

References

External links 
 Solar Energy Industries Association
 Solar Generation USA Road Trip
 The Solar Foundation
 Database of State Incentives for Renewables & Efficiency

Technology trade associations
Trade associations based in the United States
Solar energy organizations
Solar energy in the United States
Renewable energy organizations based in the United States